was a Japanese politician who was a member of the Democratic Party of Japan. He was a member of the House of Councillors in the Diet (national legislature). A native of Kanzaki, Hyōgo and high school graduate, he was elected for the first time in 2001.

Fujiwara died of liver cancer on September 15, 2018.

References

External links 
 Official website in Japanese.

1946 births
2018 deaths
Members of the House of Councillors (Japan)
Democratic Party of Japan politicians
Politicians from Hyōgo Prefecture